Edward A. Scanlon (14 May 1890 – after 1914), also known as Ted Scanlan, was an English footballer who made 29 appearances in the Football League playing for Lincoln City. He played as an inside forward or left half. He also played non-league football in his native north east of England for Wallsend, North Shields Athletic, Jarrow and South Shields, and later played in the Southern League for Swindon Town and in Scotland for Hamilton Academical.

Notes

References

1890 births
Year of death missing
People from Hebburn
Footballers from Tyne and Wear
English footballers
Association football inside forwards
Association football wing halves
North Shields F.C. players
Jarrow F.C. players
Lincoln City F.C. players
South Shields F.C. (1889) players
Swindon Town F.C. players
Hamilton Academical F.C. players
English Football League players
Southern Football League players
Place of death missing